The Geologists Range is a mountain range about  long, standing between the heads of Lucy and Nimrod Glaciers in Antarctica. Seen by the northern party of the New Zealand Geological Survey Antarctic Expedition (NZGSAE) (1961–62) and named to commemorate the work of geologists in Antarctic exploration.


List of mountains 
This range includes the following mountains and peaks:
 Mount Albright Mountain surmounting the southern end of the Endurance Cliffs. Mapped by the United States Geological Survey (USGS) from tellurometer surveys and Navy air photos, 1960–62. Named by Advisory Committee on Antarctic Names (US-ACAN) for John C. Albright, United States Antarctic Research Program (USARP) geologist on the South Pole-Queen Maud Land Traverse, 1964–65.
 Mount Csejtey – elevation unknown Mountain 1.5 mi south of Mount Macpherson in the central part of the range. Mapped by the USGS from tellurometer surveys and U.S. Navy air photos, 1960–62. Named by US-ACAN for Bela Csejtey, U.S. Antarctic Research Program (USARP) geologist at McMurdo Station, 1962–63.
 Mount Isbell –  Mountain at the northeastern perimeter of the range. The summit is 2.6 miles (4.2 km) west of Vogt Peak. Named by US-ACAN after John L Isbell, Department of Geosciences, University of Wisconsin–Milwaukee; investigator of Permian and Lower Triassic strata of the Darwin and Churchill Mountains in several field seasons, 1992–2001, including work near this mountain.
 Mount Macpherson –  Mountain standing 1.5 mi north of Mount Csejtey on the southern edge of Boucot Plateau. Seen by the northern party of the New Zealand Geological Survey Antarctic Expedition (NZGSAE) (1961–62) and named for E.O. Macpherson, formerly chief geologist of the New Zealand Geological Survey.
 Mount Summerson –  Mountain surmounting the northern end of Endurance Cliffs. Mapped by USGS from tellurometer surveys and U.S. Navy air photos, 1960–62. Named by US-ACAN for Charles H. Summerson, U.S. Antarctic Research Program (USARP) geologist to the Mount Weaver area, 1962–63.
 Vogt Peak –  Peak surmounting the east part of McKay Cliffs. Mapped by the USGS from Tellurometer surveys and U.S. Navy air photos, 1960–62. Named by US-ACAN for Peter R. Vogt, United States Antarctic Research Program (USARP) geologist at McMurdo Station, 1962–63.

List of geological features 
 Boucot Plateau A small ice-covered plateau which rises west of Wellman Cliffs and south of McKay Cliffs. Mapped by the USGS from tellurometer surveys and U.S. Navy air photos, 1960–62. Named by US-ACAN for Arthur J. Boucot, U.S. Antarctic Research Program (USARP) geologist at Byrd Station and to the Horlick Mountains, 1964–65.
 Endurance Cliffs A line of steep east-facing cliffs between Mount Summerson and Mount Albright in the southern part of the range. Mapped by the northern party of the NZGSAE (1961–62).
Seen by the northern party of the NZGSAE (1961–62) and named for Alexander McKay, pioneer New Zealand geologist.
Seen by the northern party of the NZGSAE (1961–62) and named for H.W. Wellman, geologist, who devised a simple method of map-making from air photos, used by the expedition.

References

Mountain ranges of the Ross Dependency
Shackleton Coast